National Institute of Engineering (NIE) is a private engineering college located in Mysore, Karnataka, India. It was established in 1946 and granted autonomy in 2007 from Visvesvaraya Technological University.

History
NIE was started in 1946 with diploma programs in Civil Engineering in a room under a thatched roof in Lakshmipuram under leadership of mocha. The first batch consisted of 86 students. Later, the classes were held in a shed in the nearby Sharada Vilas High School campus, in Mysore. S. Ramaswamy, D. V. Narasimha Rao and T. Ramarao ("Tunnel" Ramarao), the founders, established NIE by 1950 with its own class rooms and workshops on a  campus.
NIE started AMIE courses in Civil Engineering for intermediate-passed students in 1948. The students were permitted to change over to the regular degree course leading to B.E. degree in Civil Engineering of the University of Mysore. Thus, NIE became the second engineering college in the state of Karnataka and the first in Mysore. The first batch of students in Civil Engineering graduated in 1953.

In 1956, NIE was recognised for development during the second and subsequent five-year plans by the state and the Union governments. In 1958-59, NIE got private-aided institution status under grant-in-aid code of the Karnataka government.

A Golden Jubilee Complex was completed in 1996 on a  plot opposite the main building in part of the golden jubilee celebrations. In 2004, the college received World Bank aid under the TEQIP project. The funds obtained were used to strengthen the Centres of Excellence in the college and to set up new ones.

In 2007, NIE attained autonomy under Visvesvaraya Technological University. In 2011, NIE received further World Bank aid under the TEQIP-II. These funds were used to augment the postgraduate programs.

In March 2019, the government of Karnataka approved a private university status for NIE society through notification of The NIE University Act 2019, and it is set to start NIE University. D.A. Prasanna was designated the founder chancellor.

Location and campus

The institute is presently located on Mananthavady Road , Mysore Spread across 25 acres. The NIE Administrative Block houses the administrative offices, libraries, a gymnasium, department offices, laboratories, bank, several centres of excellence and workshops. The Golden Jubilee Block, operational since 2000, in a lush green campus, houses the Golden Jubilee Lecture Theatre Complex, a canteen and a playground area. The Diamond Jubilee Sports Complex was set up in 2009. It contains a large, 1200-capacity arena which houses courts for badminton, table tennis and other indoor sports including basketball.

Rankings 

The National Institutional Ranking Framework (NIRF) ranked NIE in the 201–250 band among engineering colleges in India in 2022.

Notable alumni 

 H. R. Janardhana Iyengar, engineer, Mysuru
 Kumar Malavalli, founder of Brocade Communication Systems
 N. R. Narayana Murthy, Executive Chairman, Infosys
 E. A. S. Prasanna, test cricketer - spin bowler
Nirmalananda Swamiji, head of Adichunchanagiri Math

References

External links

 

Engineering colleges in Mysore
Universities in Mysore
Educational institutions established in 1946
Educational institutions established in 2019
Academic institutions formerly affiliated with the University of Mysore
1946 establishments in India
2019 establishments in Karnataka